Mater Matuta was an indigenous Latin goddess, whom the Romans eventually made equivalent to the dawn goddess Aurora, and the Greek goddess Eos. Her cult is attested several places in Latium; her most famous temple was located at Satricum. In Rome she had a temple on the north side of the Forum Boarium, allegedly built by Servius Tullius, destroyed in 506 B.C., and rebuilt by Marcus Furius Camillus in 396 B.C., and she was also associated with the sea harbors and ports, where there were other temples to her.

Another remarkable place of worship was located in Campania, outside modern Capua. Dozens of votive statues representing matres matutae were found in the so-called "fondo Patturelli" (a private estate) during excavations in the 19th century. An extensive collection of these votives is housed in the Museo Campano in Capua.

Matralia
At Rome her festival was the Matralia, celebrated  on June 11 at her temple in the Forum Boarium. The festival was only for single women or women in their first marriage, who offered prayers for their nephews and nieces, and then drove a slave out of the temple.

See also
 List of Roman birth and childhood deities

References

Further reading
 Desport, Marie. "Matuta, l'Aurore chez Évandre". In: Revue des Études Anciennes. Tome 49, 1947, n°1-2. pp. 111-129. [DOI: https://doi.org/10.3406/rea.1947.3366] ; [www.persee.fr/doc/rea_0035-2004_1947_num_49_1_3366]
 Flacelière, R. Deux rites du culte de « Mater Matuta », Plutarque, Camille, 5, 2.. In: Revue des Études Anciennes. Tome 52, 1950, n°1-2. pp. 18-27. DOI: https://doi.org/10.3406/rea.1950.3415; www.persee.fr/doc/rea_0035-2004_1950_num_52_1_3415
 Kaizer, Ted. Leucothea as Mater Matuta at Colonia Berytus. A note on local mythology in the Levant and the Hellenisation of a Phoenician city. In: Syria. Tome 82, 2005. pp. 199-206. DOI: https://doi.org/10.3406/syria.2005.8691 ; www.persee.fr/doc/syria_0039-7946_2005_num_82_1_8691

External links
 
 

Solar goddesses
Roman goddesses
Dawn goddesses
Aurora (mythology)